Aganosma cymosa is a liana that can grow up to  in length, pale brownish tomentose. Flowers are white, minutely tomentose outside, glabrous at throat; tube shorter than sepals, ; lobes oblong, as long as tube. Disc longer than ovary. Ovary pubescent at apex. It is native to China (Guangxi, Yunnan), Bangladesh, India, Sri Lanka, and Indochina (Cambodia, Laos, Thailand, Vietnam).

Ecology
Aganosma cymosa is the larval host plant for Malabar tree nymph (Idea malabarica).

Vernacular names
Vernacular names include:
 Kannada: chidaralanabilu, chithra leena balli, citrelinaballi
 Malayalam: anaikaita, anakkayyerram, tsjeria-pu-pal-valli
 Tamil: manimalaankodi, sellakkodi

Taxonomy
Varieties
 Aganosma cymosa var. conferta Hook.f. - S India
 Aganosma cymosa var. cymosa - Yunnan, Guangxi, Assam, Bangladesh, Indochina
 Aganosma cymosa var. elegans (G.Don) Hook.f. - S India, Sri Lanka

References

cymosa
Flora of Asia
Plants described in 1832